Gabriel Rollenhagen, also known as Rollenhagius (1583-1619), was a German poet and writer of emblem books.

Life 
Rollenhagen, the son of the renowned poet and scholar Georg Rollenhagen, enrolled at the University of Leipzig in 1602 to study law. After his studies in 1605, he enrolled in the Faculty of Law at the University of Leiden, at the age of 23. He returned to Magdeburg in 1606 and was employed by Archbishop Christian Wilhelm of Magdeburg as the deputy of the cathedral.

Selection of works published in Germany 
 Vier Bücher wunderbarlicher, bis daher unerhörter und unglaublicher indianischer Reisen durch die Luft, Wasser, Land, Hölle, Paradies und den Himmel, Stuttgart : Hiersemann, 1995, [Nachdr. der Ausg.] Magdeburg, Kirchner, 1605
 Nvclevs emblematvm selectissimorvm, Hildesheim : Olms, 1985, Nachdr. d. Ausg. Köln 1611 
 Sinn-Bilder : Ein Tugendspiegel, Dortmund : Harenberg, 1983

Selection of works published in the Netherlands 
 Les emblemes Arnhem, J. Iansonium, 1611
 Nvclevs emblematvm selectissimorvm Arnhem, J. Janssoniū, 1613
 Emblemata volsinnighe uytbeelsels Arnhem, J. Ianszen, 1615
 Wonderbaarlyke en ongeloofelyke reizen, door de lucht, water, land, hel, paradijs, en hemel. Gedaan en beschreven door den grooten Alexander, Gajus Plinius Secundus, den philosooph Lucianus, en den abt St. Brandanus Amsterdam, T. ten Hoorn bookseller, 1682
 Nvclevs emblematvm selectissimorvm Arnhem, J. Iansoniū, early 17th century
This list was compiled from the Short Title Catalogue, Netherlands database.

Connections
Crispijn van de Passe the Elder, see: Van de Passe family
Hugo Grotius
Daniel Heinsius

Images

References 

1593 births
1619 deaths
German male poets